Cyrtopora is an extinct genus from a class of marine Bryozoans, the cyclostomes. It lived from 140 - 66 million years ago during the Cretaceous Period of Europe.

References

Prehistoric bryozoan genera
Late Cretaceous invertebrates
Extinct bryozoans
Late Cretaceous animals of Europe
Valanginian genus first appearances
Maastrichtian genus extinctions
Fossil taxa described in 1851
Hauterivian genera
Barremian genera
Aptian genera
Albian genera
Cenomanian genera
Turonian genera
Coniacian genera
Santonian genera
Campanian genera
Early Cretaceous animals of Europe
Early Cretaceous invertebrates